Live is a live album from the international music group String Sisters. The CD/DVD was recorded on the group's Norway tour in 2005/6 and was released in November 2007. Live features traditional and newly composed sets arranged and written respectively by the band members.

The album was released in 2009 by Compass Records in North America and at the end of that year was longlisted for a Grammy award. Live missed the shortlist, but bandmember Liz Carroll was nominated for another project.

Track listing
The CD and DVD have two track lists, composed mainly of the same tracks with a few additions to the DVD.

CD edition

DVD Edition
The April Child / The Joy of It!
Introduction (Annbjorg)
G-strings
The Champaign Jig Goes to Columbia / Pat and Al's Jig
Introduction (Liz C)
For the Love of Music / Tune for the Girls / Land ta Lea
Introduction (Emma)
The Hussar / Toss the Fiddles
Introduction (Catríona)
Da Trowie Burn / The Fly and Dodger
Like a Fire and Like a Storm
Introduction (Liz K)
Rumble Thy Bellyful
Introduction (Mairéad)
Tune for Frankie / Red Crow / Leslie's
Presentation Band (Annbjorg) / Introduction (Mairéad)
The Matchmaking Song (Tá Mo Chleamhnas a' Dhéanamh)
Shetland Fiddle Diva / Kinyon's Jig / Kinyon's Reel / Lad O'Beirne's
The Horsebell Tune
Saviour of the World / Gabhaim Molta Bríde / Luseblus
Farewell (Annbjorg)
Fremont Center / Ahind da daeks o' Voe / Come awa'in / Paddy's Trip to Scotland / Dinky's
Encore
The Murder in Halsingland
Wackidoo

Personnel

String Sisters
 Mairéad Ní Mhaonaigh – Irish fiddle, vocals (Ireland)
 Annbjørg Lien – Hardanger Fiddle (Norway)
 Liz Knowles – fiddle (USA)
 Catriona MacDonald – fiddle (Shetland)
 Liz Carroll – (USA)
 Emma Härdelin – (Sweden)

Misters
 David Milligan – piano (Scotland)
 Tore Bruvoll – guitar (Norway)
 Conrad Molleson – bas (Scotland)
 James Mackintosh – drums (Scotland)

References

External links
String Sisters' Official site
Mairéad Ní Mhaonaigh's Official site

String Sisters albums
2007 live albums
2007 video albums
Live video albums